The Leeds Rhinos – Wakefield Trinity rivalry is a West Yorkshire Derby born from locality and competitive history. The two sides play an annual pre-season friendly, the Festive Challenge, every Boxing Day to celebrate their rivalry.

Head-to-head record
Statistics correct as of 19/5/21

In all competitions, competitive and uncompetitive:

Meetings in major finals
1932–33 Yorkshire Cup Final: Leeds 8–0 Wakefield
1934–35 Yorkshire Cup Final: Leeds 5–5 Wakefield
Replay 1: Leeds 2–2 Wakefield
Replay 2: Leeds 13–0 Wakefield
1947–48 Yorkshire Cup Final: Wakefield 7–7 Leeds
Replay 1: Wakefield 8–7 Leeds
1958–59 Yorkshire Cup Final: Leeds 24–20 Wakefield
1961–62 Yorkshire Cup Final: Wakefield 19–9 Leeds
1964–65 Yorkshire Cup Final: Wakefield 18–2 Leeds
1967–68 Challenge Cup Final: Leeds 11–10 Wakefield
1973–74 Yorkshire Cup Final: Leeds 7–2 Wakefield

Collective Honours
As of the end of the 2021 season

Festive Challenge

The Festive Challenge is an annual friendly rugby match played between Leeds Rhinos and Wakefield Trinity that is played on Boxing Day.

History

Before the summer era of rugby league, games were regularly played on Boxing Day.

The 2010 event was postponed to New Year's Day due to poor weather.

In 2017, the fixture was moved to Belle Vue, the first time it was played away from Headingley, due to the redevelopment of Headingley Stadium.

Results

Winners

Sponsors

See also

Boxing Day Challenge
West Yorkshire derbies
Derbies in the Rugby Football League

Notes

References

 
 
Rugby league rivalries
Sports rivalries in the United Kingdom